Akosita Ravato (born 16 April 1991) is a Fijian rugby union player. She plays for Fiji internationally and for the Fijiana Drua in the Super W competition.

Biography 
Ravato previously repre­sented Fiji in basketball at the age of 15 while still a student at Yat Sen Secondary School.

In 2022, Ravato was named in the Fijiana Drua squad for the Super W competition. She made her Super W debut against the Queensland Reds in round 2. She featured in the Drua side that handed the Waratahs women their first Super W loss. She was named on the reserves for the Grand Final against the Waratahs.

Ravato came off the bench against Australia when the two sides met for the first time in 2022. She featured at the 2022 Oceania Championship in New Zealand. She was named in the reserves against Tonga and scored a try in Fijiana's final game against Samoa.

In September 2022, She was selected for the Fijiana squad to the 2021 Rugby World Cup in New Zealand.

References 

1991 births
Living people
Female rugby union players
Fijian female rugby union players
Fiji women's international rugby union players